Timino is a rural locality (a village) in Roksomskoye Rural Settlement, Vashkinsky District, Vologda Oblast, Russia. The population was 29 as of 2002.

Geography 
The distance to Lipin Bor is 26.5 km, to Parfenovo is 0.5 km. Vasyutino is the nearest rural locality.

References 

Rural localities in Vashkinsky District